Robert Peričić (born 15 June 1987) is a Croatian retired footballer who last played for Balestier Khalsa in the S.League.

Career

Balestier Khalsa 
Peričić moved to the S.League in 2015 to join Singaporean side Balestier Khalsa for the 2015 S.League season, after spending most of his professional career playing for clubs in the Croatian football leagues. On 6 March 2015, 5 days after Peričić's competitive debut for the club, he scored his first goal against Geylang International, securing a 2–1 win for his team. On 24 May 2016, following a series of knee injuries that ruled Peričić out for the first half of the 2016 S.League season, he was released with mutual consent by Balestier Khalsa having made a total of 28 competitive appearances and scoring 10 goals for the Tigers.

Honours 
 2. HNL Man of the Match (6)
 2. HNL Team of the Year (1)
 Singapore League Cup
 Runner-up: 2015

References

External links
 
 

1987 births
Living people
Footballers from Rijeka
Association football forwards
Croatian footballers
NK Crikvenica players
NK Novalja players
HNK Gorica players
NK Hrvatski Dragovoljac players
Balestier Khalsa FC players
First Football League (Croatia) players
Singapore Premier League players
Croatian expatriate footballers
Expatriate footballers in Singapore
Croatian expatriate sportspeople in Singapore